POTC may refer to:

potC RNA motif, an RNA structure
Pirates of the Caribbean, a Disney franchise
Philippine Overseas Telecommunications Corporation
1st Pursuit Organization and Training Center, at Villeneuve-les-Vertus Aerodrome, 1918